Chief Government Security Office (CGSO) is a unit under the Prime Minister's Department of the Malaysian federal government. CGSO is responsible to provide 'security protection' on all government assets such as federal buildings and so on. CGSO also provides 'security clearance' to ensure that members of extremist groups do not become members of the civil service.

History
The Chief Government Security Office was appointed to be responsible to the Permanent Secretary of the Prime Minister's Department through the terms of reference of the Government Security Officer dated 15 June 1957 and "Confidential General Circular No. 1, of 1958, Government Security Officer, Federation of Malaya". 

The main task of this position is to provide security advisory services to State Governments, Ministries, Departments and government agencies with the aim of helping to maintain the level of physical security, document security and personnel security in all government agencies set by the government from time to time to protect against espionage and sabotage and from unauthorized information leakage from all Government Departments and agencies. 

This office was moved to the Ministry of Home Affairs when the ministry was established in the early 1960s. This office has once again moved back to the Prime Minister's Department from January 1, 1977 until now to re-execute duties and responsibilities related to protection security as set.

Functions
 Policy makers related to Security Protection management;
 Dealing with any threat of sabotage that may affect the functioning of the government and national interests;
 Give awareness and foster a culture of Safety Protection;
 Enforce and ensure compliance with the Official Secrets Act 1972 and the Security Directive (Revised and Amended 2017);
 Ensuring compliance with ICT Protection Security in accordance with the Security Directive (Revision and Amendment 2017) and the regulations currently in force;
 Management of the personal security policy of public officials and related private parties;
 Protecting the country's Critical Assets and Targets.

Protective security units
National law enforcement agencies of Malaysia
Prime Minister's Department (Malaysia)
1957 establishments in Malaya
Government agencies established in 1957
Malaysian intelligence agencies